Boston Harbor tunnel may refer to one of the following  tunnels under Boston Harbor:
Callahan Tunnel
Sumner Tunnel
Ted Williams Tunnel

See also
List of crossings of the Charles River